Gyretria is a genus of flies belonging to the family Lesser Dung flies.

Species
G. biseta (Duda, 1925)
G. melanogaster (Thomson, 1869)

References

Sphaeroceridae
Diptera of South America
Brachycera genera